Baradar may refer to:

 Dah Baradar, a village in Zirtang Rural District, Lorestan Province, Iran
 Haft Baradar, also known as Qater Yuran-e Sofla, a village in Ojarud-e Shomali Rural District, Ardabil Province, Iran
 Seh Baradar, also known as Seh Barar, a village in Lajran Rural District, Semnan Province, Iran

 Abdul Ghani Baradar, co-founder and political leader of the Afghan Taliban

See also 
 Barabar, caves in Bihar, India
 Barada (disambiguation)
 Baradari (disambiguation)